Cătălin Țăranu (in Japanese: タラヌ・カタリン, Taranu Katarin; born March 31, 1973 in Romania), is one of the very few professional players of the board game of Go from outside Asia.

Biography 
Țăranu started learning Go from Cristian Cobeli in 1989, at the age of 16. His first tournament was for players in the 10 to 4 Kyū range, when he was a 6 kyu. He won all eight games. He moved up to amateur 1 dan in a year, and just a year later moved up to 4 dan. He started winning small tournaments in Romania around this time. He was invited to Japan by Saijo Masataka in 1995. He quickly joined the Nagoya branch of the Nihon-Kiin and became an insei. After two years, he became the second European (after Manfred Wimmer from Austria in 1978) to pass the professional examination. It took Cătălin just 4 years to reach 5p (5-dan professional).

He won the European Go Championship in 2008.

He was the president of the Romanian Go Federation from 2009 to 2011.

References 
 Cătălin Țăranu's Introduction (source: Gobase.org)
 Sensei's Library
 Cătălin Țăranu on the European Go Database

External links
Țăranu's Go school
Nihon Ki-in profile (in Japanese)

1973 births
Living people
People from Gura Humorului
Romanian Go players